Poštorná is a municipal district located in the town of Břeclav, South Moravia, Czech Republic.

Former football club SK Tatran Poštorná was based in the district.

External links
 Poštorná statistics at Ministry of the Interior website 
 Databáze statistických obvodů (Statistical database of districts) 

Populated places in Břeclav District
Neighbourhoods in the Czech Republic